Tommie Lee Bowens Jr. (born July 7, 1940) is a retired American basketball player. A 6'8" (2.03 m) and 220 lb (100 kg) forward/center from Okolona, Mississippi, he played collegiately for the Grambling State University Tigers.

He played for the Denver Rockets (1967–68), New York Nets (1968–69) and New Orleans Buccaneers (1969–70) in the ABA for 211 games.

External links

1940 births
Living people
American men's basketball players
Basketball players from Mississippi
Centers (basketball)
Denver Rockets players
Grambling State Tigers men's basketball players
New York Nets players
New Orleans Buccaneers players
People from Okolona, Mississippi
Power forwards (basketball)